Danielle Nicole  (born Danielle Nicole Schnebelen) is an American blues/soul musician from Kansas City, Missouri, United States. Her self-titled solo debut EP was released March 10, 2015 on Concord Records. The self-titled EP features Grammy Award-winning producer-guitarist Anders Osborne, Galactic's co-founding drummer Stanton Moore and keyboardist Mike Sedovic. On February 25, 2015, American Blues Scene premiered the track "Didn't Do You No Good" off the new EP.

In May 2019, she received Blues Music Awards for both Contemporary Blues Female Artist and Bass Instrumentalist.

Background
Danielle Nicole was previously in the band Trampled Under Foot with her brothers Kris and Nick Schnebelen.  At the 2014 Blues Music Awards, Trampled Under Foot's album, Badlands, won the 'Contemporary Blues Album of the Year' category. At the same ceremony, Danielle Nicole, under the name of Danielle Schnebelen, triumphed in the 'Best Instrumentalist – Bass' category.

Career

In September 2015, her debut album, Wolf Den, was released on Concord Records. It reached number 2 in the Billboard Top Blues Albums chart in October that year. The album was produced by Anders Osborne and Ryan Kingsbury.  Writers included Danielle Nicole, Anders Osborne, Al Jackson Jr. and Mike Sedovic.  Players were Danielle Nicole, vocals/bass; Anders Osborne and Luther Dickinson, guitars; Mike Sedovic, keyboards; Stanton Moore, drums.

On March 10, 2018, Danielle Nicole's second release, Cry No More, peaked at number 1 in the Billboard Top Blues Albums Chart  and included producer collaborator Tony Braunagel; writers Danielle Schnebelen, Bill Withers, Prince, Jeff Paris, Tamara Champlin, Maia Sharp, Pam Rose, Anthony LaPeau and John Lardieri. Players were Danielle Nicole, vocals/bass; Nick Schnebelen, Brandon Miller, Walter Trout, Kenny Wayne Shepherd, Monster Mike Welch, Luther Dickinson and Johnny Lee Schell, guitars; Mike Sedovic, Mike Finnigan, and Kelly Finnigan, organs; Tony Braunagel, drums; with Maxanne Lewis and Kudisan Kai as background vocalists.  The TV series, S.W.A.T., used "Save Me"  from this album on the February 21, 2019 episode of the show.

Danielle Nicole along with Christone Ingram, did the warm up show for the Fourth Annual Utah Blues Festival June, 2018 at the State Room,  headlined with her band, Brandon Miller and Kris Schnebelen at the International Blues Festival in Canada in July 2018, and at the Bean Blossom Blues Festival in Indiana in August 2018. She performed with an orchestra her tribute to Etta James and Aretha Franklin at Knuckleheads Saloon November 2018 and, in February 2019, was part of a cruise and concert at Knuckleheads for the Michael Ledbetter Foundation.

Danielle Nicole's awards have included the Independent Blues Award for best contemporary CD in Blues Blast magazine, and Top 20 Blues Rock Roots Album. She was inducted into Canada's South Blues Society Hall of Fame.

Cry No More was nominated for a 2019 Grammy Award in Contemporary blues.

In May 2019, Danielle Nicole's album Cry No More, received two Blues Music Awards for Contemporary Blues Female Artist and Bass Instrumentalist and garnered three additional Independent Blues Awards in September 2019 for best R&B Soul CD, Music Video for the album's title track, and R&B Soul Song for Prince's "How Come U Don't Call Me Anymore?".

In June 2021 and May 2022, Danielle was awarded the Blues Foundation's Music Award for bass instrumentalist.   She was on the cover of Blues Blast Magazine  and garnished the bass guitar award for 2022 in their magazine in September of 2022.  She had a featured article, "Lady Sings the Blues" by Bertrand Deveaud, in Rollingstone Magazine, France, June 2022.  

In August 2021, Danielle paired with Bonfire Music to oversee the Danielle Nicole Band's booking and tour schedule.

Discography

EPs 

 Danielle Nicole (March 10, 2015)

Albums 

 Wolf Den (September 15, 2015)
 Live at the Gospel Lounge (May 22, 2017)
 Cry No More (February 23, 2018)

Danielle Nicole  (EP) 

Danielle Nicole is the first studio release by American singer-songwriter Danielle Nicole. It was released on March 10, 2015. The studio tracks were recorded in New Orleans, while the last two tracks were recorded live at Kansas City's KTBG-The Bridge 90.9 radio station.

Critical reception 
Writing for Blues Blast magazine, Rex Bartholomew said that the EP "provided a great sound bite of what [Nicole] can do on her own, and it is a very nice piece of work."

Track listing

Personnel 

 Danielle Nicole – vocals, bass
 Anders Osbourne – guitar
 Mike Sedovic – keyboards
 Stanton Moore – drums

References

External links

American blues singers
American blues guitarists
American bass guitarists
American soul singers
American soul guitarists
Blues bass guitarists
Concord Records artists
Women bass guitarists
Musicians from Kansas City, Missouri
Living people
Singers from Missouri
Year of birth missing (living people)
Guitarists from Missouri
American women guitarists
21st-century American women
Trampled Under Foot (band) members